Marvin Pierce (June 17, 1893 – July 17, 1969) was president of McCall Corporation, the publisher of the popular women's magazines Redbook and McCall's. He was the father of United States First Lady Barbara Pierce Bush, the maternal grandfather of former U.S. President George W. Bush and former Florida Governor Jeb Bush, and the father-in-law of former U.S. President George H. W. Bush.

Early life
Marvin Pierce was born on June 17, 1893 in Sharpsville, Pennsylvania, to Mabel Pierce (née Marvin; 1869–1955) and Scott Pierce (1866–1945). Mr. Pierce was an insurance salesman in Dayton, Ohio. His ancestor Thomas Pierce (1618–1683), an early New England colonist, was also an ancestor of Franklin Pierce, the 14th President of the United States. Marvin was a 1916 graduate of Miami University, Oxford, Ohio, where he was a member of Beta Theta Pi fraternity, he was nicknamed "Monk" and was a stand-out athlete in football, basketball, baseball and tennis.  He was inducted into Miami's Athletic Hall of Fame in 1972. He also received graduate degrees from MIT in civil engineering and from Harvard in architectural engineering.

Career
Pierce served as the president of McCall Corporation, the publisher of the popular women's magazines Redbook and McCall's.

Personal life
Pierce's first marriage (August 1918) was to Pauline Robinson (1896-1949), who was born on 28 April 1896 to Ohio Supreme Court justice James E. Robinson and his wife Lula Dell Flickinger. They had four children together:
 Martha Pierce Rafferty (1920–1999), mother of filmmakers Kevin Rafferty and Pierce Rafferty
 James Pierce (1922–1993)
 Barbara Pierce Bush (1925–2018), First Lady of the United States from 1989 to 1993.
 Scott Pierce (1930-2022) – named for his grandfather

W magazine once described Pauline Robinson as "beautiful, fabulous, critical, and meddling" and "a former beauty from Ohio with extravagant tastes". Pauline was killed at age 53 in a September 1949 automotive accident when Marvin, the driver, hit a tree in Harrison, Westchester County, New York.  His granddaughter Pauline Robinson Bush (1949-1953), was named after her.

Their third child, Barbara Pierce, later became the wife of the 41st President of the United States, George H. W. Bush, mother of the 43rd President of the United States, George W. Bush and of the 43rd Governor of Florida, Jeb Bush.

Pierce's second marriage (June 1952) was to Willa Gray Martin (1911–2006) (who died during his grandson's presidency), an artist and Associated Press reporter.

He also has at least 17 great-grandchildren, including Jenna Bush Hager, and at least 11 great-great-grandchildren.

Death and legacy
Pierce died on July 17, 1969 in Rye, New York at the age of 76 and was interred at Greenwood Union Cemetery. Marvin Pierce Bush, one of his grandsons, is named after him. He was survived by his children, two daughters-in-law, two sons-in-law (one of whom is George H. W. Bush), and his grandchildren (one of whom is George W. Bush). He was preceded in death by his granddaughter Pauline Robinson Bush in October 1953.

References

External links
 Barbara Pierce Bush National First Ladies Library

1893 births
1969 deaths
American magazine publishers (people)
Franklin Pierce family
Miami RedHawks football players
Harvard Graduate School of Design alumni
MIT School of Engineering alumni
People from Mercer County, Pennsylvania
Players of American football from Pennsylvania